Oxalis spiralis, the spiral sorrel, is a species of plant of the genus Oxalis, a member of the wood sorrel family Oxalidaceae.

Taxonomy
The following subspecies are accepted:
 Oxalis spiralis subsp. spiralis
 Oxalis spiralis subsp. membranifolia (R.Knuth) Lourteig
 Oxalis spiralis subsp. trichophora Lourteig
 Oxalis spiralis subsp. vulcanicola (Donn.Sm.) Lourteig – volcanic sorrel, velvet oxalis

Distribution
Oxalis spiralis is native to Central America and western South America.

Cultivation
Spiral sorrel is cultivated for its ornamental value. Several cultivars of Oxalis spiralis subsp. vulcanicola are available, including:
 O. spiralis subsp. vulcanicola 'Aureus' – bright yellow-green foliage 
 O. spiralis subsp. vulcanicola 'Molten Lava' – bright yellow-green and copper-red foliage
 O. spiralis subsp. vulcanicola 'Zinfandel' – dark purple, nearly black foliage
 O. spiralis subsp. vulcanicola 'Plum Crazy' – dark purple foliage, randomly variegated

Gallery

References

spiralis